The 1998–99 Northern Football League season was the 101st in the history of Northern Football League, a football competition in England. Division One was won by Bedlington Terriers and Division Two was won by Durham City. Bedlington opted against promotion to the Northern Premier League.

The league held two cup competitions. The Northern League Cup, competed for by all Northern League sides, was won by Dunston Federation. They beat Jarrow Roofing 4–1 in the final. The Craven Cup, for Division Two teams, was won by Ashington defeating Evenwood Town 1–0 in the final.

Division One

Division One featured 17 clubs which competed in the division last season, along with three new clubs, promoted from Division Two:
 Chester-le-Street Town
 Marske United
 West Auckland Town

Also, RTM Newcastle changed name to Newcastle Blue Star.

League table

Division Two

Division Two featured 16 clubs which competed in the division last season, along with three new clubs, relegated from Division One:
 Durham City
 Murton
 Northallerton Town

League table

Cup Competitions

Northern League Cup

Craven Cup
For Division Two teams

References

External links
 Northern Football League official site

Northern Football League seasons
1998–99 in English football leagues